Kakhabroso is a rural locality (a selo) and the administrative center of Kakhabrosinsky Selsoviet, Untsukulsky District, Republic of Dagestan, Russia. The population was 795 as of 2010. There are 5 streets.

Geography 
Kakhabroso is located 29 km northwest of Shamilkala (the district's administrative centre) by road. Betli is the nearest rural locality.

References 

Rural localities in Untsukulsky District